Joseph Ernest Ashworth (born 28 January 1902) was an English footballer. He was on the books of three clubs — Everton, Nottingham Forest and Blackpool — but he only made Football League appearances for Forest.

References

1902 births
Year of death missing
English footballers
Everton F.C. players
Nottingham Forest F.C. players
Blackpool F.C. players
Association football outside forwards